Robert Joseph McGann (8 September 1905 – 20 April 1989) was an Australian rules footballer who played with Footscray in the Victorian Football League (VFL).

Notes

External links 

Bob McGann's playing statistics from The VFA Project

1905 births
1989 deaths
Australian rules footballers from Victoria (Australia)
Western Bulldogs players
Preston Football Club (VFA) players